Angelina Ballerina: The Next Steps is a CGI preschool animated children's television series and the successor/spin-off of the Angelina Ballerina television series from 2001 to 2006; both series are in turn based on the Angelina Ballerina series of children's books by Katharine Holabird, the author and Helen Craig, the illustrator. The series first aired on September 5, 2009, on PBS Kids in the United States.

The Next Steps is different from the first TV series as it uses CGI animation. This series sees eight-year-old Angelina and her family move to the other side of Chipping Cheddar to attend a performing arts school called Camembert Academy. It features the debut of Ms. Mimi, Angelina's new teacher and new friends like Viki, Marco, Gracie, and A.Z., as well as her best friend Alice who joins Camembert Academy.

The series features songs with music by Mark Sayer-Wade, Scott Erickson and Mark Williamson and lyrics by Judy Rothman, Williamson and Erickson, as well as several songs written and arranged by Barney & Friends composer, Joseph K. Phillips, and footage from host Moira Quirk. Richard M. Sherman is the music director of the series. 40 episodes were produced.

Overview
Angelina Ballerina: The Next Steps celebrates music and songs and brings to life many forms of dance for Angelina including ballet, tap dancing, jazz, classical, and ethnic. As a ballerina, Angelina's life revolves around dancing, singing and performance, family, friends, friendship, and following her dreams.

Episodes

Characters

Main
 Angelina Mouseling (voiced by Charlotte Spencer) is the protagonist of the series. She is a feisty, cheerful and happy-go-lucky mouseling who still dreams to become a prima ballerina. She has grown up and moved to the other side of Chipping Cheddar with her family to attend a performing arts school, Camembert Academy. Her catchphrases are "Absolutely, positively!", "Really truly!", "Stupendous!", "Follow your dreams!", "Let's dance!", "Get up and dance!", "I'm Angelina Ballerina!", "Hoop-dee-doo!" and "Hooray!" She has purple eyes and pinkish-white fur, wears a pink tanktop leotard, pink tutu with a red rose on it, a pink ribbon in her hair, and pink ballet slippers.
 Alice Nimbletoes (voiced by Naomi McDonald) is Angelina's best friend and an aspiring gymnast. She is optimistic, enthusiastic, feisty, cheerful, happy-go-lucky and always up for a new adventure. Kind, innocent, and with a heart of gold, Alice is a bit forgetful, but she will try harder than everybody else. Her catchphrases are "Ooooh...it's the best fun ever!", "Knock, knock, who's there?", "Follow your dreams!", "Let's dance!", "Get up and dance!", "Hoop-dee-doo!" and "Hooray!" She has light brown fur and green eyes. She wears a long-sleeved green top, a green skirt, green ballet slippers, and a green ribbon in her hair.
 Marco (voiced by Jules de Jongh in US version and Lous Williams in UK) is a Latin American student from the exotic tropical country of Costa Mousa. He is one of Angelina's best friends Marco likes to play and hear music. Besides loving music, he is also wildly enthusiastic about sports, especially soccer. Marco has taught himself to play multiple instruments, and his favorite musical instrument is the conga drums. A helpful mouseling, Marco sometimes gets into jams due to Angelina's big ideas. He is also a great drummer. His catchphrase is "I just thought of a great rhythm!". He has light brown fur with green eyes, wears a blue T-shirt, blue trousers, dark blue sneakers and a blue wristband around his right wrist.
 Gracie (voiced by Jo Wyatt who was also a voice actor in the original Angelina Ballerina series) is often Angelina's French rival and friend who is meticulous and a tad self-absorbed, and has shown to be a teacher's pet in order to get Ms. Mimi's attentions. Like Angelina, Gracie loves being the star of the show but often uses those occasions to brag. Nonetheless, Angelina knows Gracie is a very kind-hearted friend, and the competition keeps Angelina on her toes. Her catchphrase is "I can do it perfectly!" She has orange fur. She wears a yellow long-sleeved top, a yellow skirt, a blue headband with a yellow flower on it and blue ballet slippers.
 Viki (voiced by Emily Dormer in UK dub and Jules de Jongh in US dub) is an exciting American friend for Angelina at Camembert Academy. She loves ethnic and unusual forms of dance, and she will be the first to try anything new. She is an Irish music lover and a great bass player. She likes standing out from the crowd and doing things her own way. Her catchphrase is "So amazing!" She has gray fur. She wears an orange dress, yellow leggings, orange and yellow stars in her hair, and yellow ballet slippers.
 A.Z. (AJ in the British version) (voiced by Lizzie Waterworth-Santo, who is best known for voicing Horrid Henry) is an American hip-hop student. He knows about the latest culture phenomenon, such as the latest handshake, line dance and cheese du jour. His catchphrase is "A.Z. Mouse is in the house!" He wears a red hoodie, blue jeans, and sneakers.
 Ms. Mimi (voiced by Judith Mason) is the head teacher at Camembert Academy and is everyone's American role model. She is modern, young, fun, warm, and caring. She adores little mouselings as much as they adore her, and loves to inspire them with her own vivid imagination. Her catchphrase is "Bravo, students! Marvelous music and dancing!" She wears a purple dress, purple leggings, green ballet slippers, and a green headband.
 Mr. Maurice Mouseling (voiced by Simon Mattacks) is Angelina and Polly's father. He works as a reporter for the Mouseland Herald and keeps his finger on the pulse of the happenings in Chipping Cheddar. In the episode "Angelina and the Marcel Mouseau Mime Challenge", it is revealed that Mr. Mouseling was a drummer in a rock band. He wears glasses, a white shirt under a brown jacket, and blue trousers.
 Mrs. Matilda Mouseling (voiced by Emma Tate) is Angelina and Polly's mother. Supportive yet firm, she provides the voice of reason the young starlet Angelina needs. In the episode "Angelina's Fancy Tutu", it is revealed that she was once a ballerina. She wears a pink dress, white necklace, and reddish-purple shoes.
 Polly Mouseling (voiced by Leah Zabari) is Angelina's 4-year-old sister. Polly is an eager Mouseling whenever Angelina takes the time to show her some of the basics of ballet. When there are steps she cannot copy, Polly is happy to make up her own, much to Angelina's dismay. Her catchphrase is "I love you, Angelina!" She wears a yellow shirt, a blue dress (with suspenders), yellow socks and red shoes.
 Mrs. Thimble (voiced by Beverley Klein) is the owner of the sweets store next door to Mr. Mouseling's music store. She is an elderly mouseling with grey fur and wears a lavender dress with black dots and a bead collar, a white apron, a gold watch, green shoes and glasses.

Special guests
 Kenichi Ebina
 Black Violin
 The Keltic Dreams
 The New York Chinese Cultural Center
 The Icon Dance Complex
 The American Ballroom Theater Youth Dance Company
 The New York City Youth Tap Ensemble
 Yibiao

DVD compilation

References

External links 

 Official Character Bios (PDF)
 Channel 5 Website Episode Listing

2000s American animated television series
2010s American animated television series
2000s American children's television series
2010s American children's television series
2009 American television series debuts
2010 American television series endings
2000s British children's television series
2010s British children's television series
2000s British animated television series
2010s British animated television series
2009 British television series debuts
2010 British television series endings
2010s preschool education television series
2000s preschool education television series
American children's animated musical television series
American computer-animated television series
American preschool education television series
American sequel television series
American television shows based on children's books
American television series with live action and animation
Animated preschool education television series
British children's animated musical television series
British computer-animated television series
British preschool education television series
British television shows based on children's books
British television series with live action and animation
Animated television series about children
Animated television series about mice and rats
Television series about ballet
PBS Kids shows
PBS original programming
Television series by Mattel Creations
Television series by 9 Story Media Group
Television series by WNET
HIT Entertainment
Dance animation
English-language television shows